Dieter Semetzky (born 3 November 1949) is a German rower who competed for East Germany in the 1968 Summer Olympics.

He was born in Dresden.

In 1968 he was the coxswain of the East German boat which won the silver medal in the coxed fours event.

External links
 profile

1949 births
Living people
Coxswains (rowing)
Olympic rowers of East Germany
Rowers at the 1968 Summer Olympics
Olympic silver medalists for East Germany
Rowers from Dresden
Olympic medalists in rowing
East German male rowers
Medalists at the 1968 Summer Olympics